George of the Jungle is an American animated television series produced and created by Jay Ward and Bill Scott, who also created The Rocky and Bullwinkle Show. The character George was inspired by the story of Tarzan and a cartoon characterization of George Eiferman (Mr. America, Mr. Universe, IFBB Hall of Famer) drawn by a cook on his mine sweeper in the Navy during World War II. It ran for 17 episodes on Saturday mornings from September 9 to December 30, 1967, on the American television network ABC.

Program format
Each episode featured three segments in the form of three unrelated cartoons: George of the Jungle, Tom Slick, and Super Chicken. Each of the cartoons ended with a strike on the tympani (kettle drum), which changed to an ascending tone, following a pun.

Unlike previous Ward series, the animation production was done in Hollywood using veteran animators Phil Duncan, Rod Scribner, and Rudy Zamora, among others. Each segment's theme song was written by the team of Stan Worth and Sheldon Allman, though the cartoons themselves had little or no music scoring, as with Rocky and Bullwinkle. Ward mainstays Bill Scott, June Foray, Paul Frees, and Daws Butler provided most of the character voices over all three segments.

The cartoons are technically more advanced than the rather crude animation in Ward's earlier series, which originated from Gamma Productions, a Mexican studio sponsored by Ward. He was so pleased with George of the Jungle that he allowed production to go over budget, which resulted in considerable financial loss, ultimately limiting the series to 17 episodes.

The complete series is available now on DVD.

Segments

George of the Jungle
The title segment, George of the Jungle, is a parody of the Tarzan stories of Edgar Rice Burroughs. George (voiced by Bill Scott) is a dim-witted but big-hearted "ape man" who is always called upon by District Commissioner Alistair (voiced by Paul Frees) to save inhabitants of the jungle territory of Mbwebwe Province in Africa from various threats.

In the opening title, George is depicted swinging on vines, repeatedly slamming face-first into trees or other obstacles even as theme-song singers warn him to "watch out for that tree!" Another running gag is that George keeps forgetting that he lives in a treehouse, falling from it to the ground every time he leaves home.

George's "beloved mate" is Ursula (voiced by June Foray), a Jane-like character (The character was referred to as Jane in the first episode and original pilot) far brighter than George, whom George refers to as "Fella" (the phrase in the title song "while Fella and Ursula stay in step..." is meant to show that they are the same person). George's closest friend is an ape named Ape (voiced by Paul Frees impersonating Ronald Colman) who, like Ursula, is far more intelligent than George. George has a pet elephant named Shep, who behaves like a lap dog, or, as George refers to him, a "great big peanut-lovin' poochie," and who George thinks is a dog. Also of note is the Tooky Tooky (or Tookie Tookie) bird, famous for his call: "Ah ah ee ee tooky tooky!"

George's two most frequent foes are a pair of stereotypical hunters named "Tiger" Titheridge (voiced by Daws Butler) and "Weevil" Plumtree (voiced by Paul Frees). Tiger, the taller of the two, wears a pith helmet and khakis, has a pencil moustache, and speaks in an Oxford accent, while Weevil talks like a pirate and wears a white t-shirt and shorts with a bush hat. Another one of George's recurring enemies is a mad scientist named Dr. Chicago (voiced by Daws Butler).

George, though hopelessly unintelligent, possesses substantial strength and jungle instincts that allow him to track down enemies. When trapped in a seemingly hopeless situation, he carries a miniature phrase book with numerous animal calls to summon help—although he usually gives the wrong call.

Tom Slick

Tom Slick features the title character (voiced by Bill Scott), a racecar driver who competes in races with his trusty vehicle, the Thunderbolt Greaseslapper. He is accompanied by his girlfriend Marigold (voiced by June Foray), and his elderly mechanic Gertie Growler (also voiced by Bill Scott). Tom's chief antagonists are Baron Otto Matic (voiced by Paul Frees) and his lackey Clutcher (voiced by Daws Butler impersonating Frank Fontaine as "Crazy Guggenheim"), whom the Baron often hits across the head with a monkey wrench when he messes up Otto's plots.

Super Chicken

Super Chicken features the title character (voiced by Bill Scott in a Boston Brahmin accent), a superhero (who, in "real life", is wealthy Henry Cabot Henhouse III) with a lion sidekick named Fred (voiced by Paul Frees impersonating Ed Wynn). Super Chicken usually begins their adventures with the battle cry, "To the Super Coop, Fred!", to which Fred replies, "Roger Willcox!" When Fred comments on his latest injury, Super Chicken responds with a variation on the theme, "You knew the job was dangerous when you took it, Fred!"  Following his own mistakes, Super Chicken remarks, "I'm glad no one was here to see that!"

Episodes
Each of the following episodes consists of a George of the Jungle cartoon, a Super Chicken cartoon, and a Tom Slick cartoon.

Home media
On February 12, 2008, Classic Media released a complete collection of the 1967 series which included, as a bonus feature, the original pilot cartoons for both George of the Jungle and Super Chicken.

Reception
In 2002, TV Guide ranked George of the Jungle #30 on its "50 Greatest Cartoon Characters of All Time" list.

Spin-offs

Comic book
Gold Key Comics published two issues of a comic book based on the series in 1969.

Films

In 1997, the segment was adapted into a live-action film, titled George of the Jungle. Brendan Fraser played the title role, with Leslie Mann as Ursula, John Cleese as the voice of Ape and Thomas Haden Church as the villain, Lyle Van De Groot. A direct-to-video sequel, George of the Jungle 2, starring Christopher Showerman as George and Julie Benz as Ursula, was released in 2003.

2007 series

Classic Media developed a new George of the Jungle Flash animation series 40 years later in 2007. It now utilizes a co-production. The new version of the series is co-produced with Studio B Productions and Teletoon Canada (with other studios also involved), and currently airs on Teletoon in Canada and on Cartoon Network in the United States (starting with a Christmas-themed episode December 21, 2007). The series was scheduled to air on Nicktoons in the United Kingdom and Disney Channel Asia in Southeast Asia. The series officially premiered on Cartoon Network on January 18. Both seasons are available digitally on iTunes.

The series initially ran 26 episodes, with two George stories per episode for a total of 52 stories. In 2016, 26 additional episodes were made, also with two George stories per episode.

Cultural references
"Weird Al" Yankovic did a cover version of the George of the Jungle theme on his 1985 album Dare to Be Stupid, the only straight cover Yankovic ever released on an album, and which later appeared on the soundtrack of the 1997 live-action film.  Another cover of the theme by The Presidents of the United States of America also appeared on the soundtrack and was the title theme for the film.

The Rhino Records 1989 release Rerun Rock: Superstars Sing Television Themes included a cover version performed in the style of "Whole Lotta Love" by Led Zeppelin and sung by Scott Shaw.

References

External links
 
 Official Cartoon Network site 
 George of the Jungle' at Don Markstein's Toonopedia. Archived from the original on August 3, 2016.

 
1960s American animated television series
1967 American television series debuts
1967 American television series endings
Jay Ward Productions
DreamWorks Classics
American Broadcasting Company original programming
Television shows set in Africa
Jungles in fiction
Africa in fiction
American children's animated comedy television series
Tarzan parodies